Dominik Sucheński (8 September 1926 – 20 May 2013) was a Polish sprinter. He competed in the men's 4 × 100 metres relay at the 1952 Summer Olympics.

References

1926 births
2013 deaths
Athletes (track and field) at the 1952 Summer Olympics
Polish male sprinters
Olympic athletes of Poland
Place of birth missing